

Events
 1210 – Rebuilding of Coutances Cathedral, in France, in its current gothic aspect begins after the destruction of the previous romanesque building in a fire.

Buildings and structures

Buildings
 1211
 Santiago de Compostela Cathedral in Galicia (Spain) (begun in the 11th century) completed and consecrated.
 Restoration of Reims Cathedral to its current aspect begun.
 1213
 Screen wall at Adhai Din Ka Jhonpra mosque in Ajmer, Rajasthan.
 Guyue Bridge in China built.
 1214 – Holy Cross Church, Lehre in Lower Saxony completed in its original form about this date.
 1218 – Htilominlo Temple built in Bagan, Pagan Kingdom (begun in 1211).
 1219 – Toompea Castle begun in Tallinn.

Births

Deaths

References

Architecture